Liešno (until 1899 ) is a village and municipality in Turčianske Teplice District in the Žilina Region of northern central Slovakia.

History
In historical records the village was first mentioned in 1322.

Geography
The municipality lies at an altitude of 472 metres and covers an area of 1.944 km². It has a population of about 57 people.

See also
Villages in Slovakia
List of municipalities and towns in Slovakia

Villages and municipalities in Turčianske Teplice District